The Missouri Department of Transportation (MoDOT) is a state government organization in charge of maintaining public roadways of the U.S. state of Missouri under the guidance of the Missouri Highways and Transportation Commission. MoDOT designs, builds and maintains roads and bridges, improves airports, river ports, railroads, public transit systems and pedestrian and bicycle travel.

MoDOT has been one of the leaders in the construction of the diverging diamond interchange, having built the first such interchange in the United States in June 2009 in Springfield.

Regional Districts
MoDOT operates seven districts throughout the state:
Northwest, based in St. Joseph
Northeast, based in Hannibal
Kansas City, based in Lee's Summit
Central, based in Jefferson City
St. Louis, based in Chesterfield
Southwest, based in Springfield
Southeast, based in Sikeston

References

External links
Official website
Publications by or about the Missouri Department of Transportation at Internet Archive.

Transportation in Missouri
State departments of transportation of the United States
Transportation, Department of
1907 establishments in Missouri